The Casino del Sol College All-Star Game was a post-season college football all-star game that was established in 2011 as part of the post-BCS events; the game was discontinued after its third playing, in 2013.

The game was first played at Sun Devil Stadium in Tempe, Arizona, in January 2011, when it was sponsored by Eastham Energy. The game then relocated to Tucson, Arizona, and was played at Kino Veterans Memorial Stadium. The game was sponsored by Casino Del Sol, a casino located in Tucson, for its final two years.

Game results

Game MVPs

See also
 List of college bowl games

References

External links
 Casino Del Sol All-Star Game Website

Recurring sporting events established in 2011
College football all-star games
Sports in Tucson, Arizona
Recurring sporting events disestablished in 2014
2011 establishments in Arizona
2014 disestablishments in Arizona
Events in Tucson, Arizona